Events from the year 1876 in Scotland.

Incumbents

Law officers 
 Lord Advocate – Edward Strathearn Gordon until July; then William Watson
 Solicitor General for Scotland – William Watson; then John Macdonald

Judiciary 
 Lord President of the Court of Session and Lord Justice General – Lord Glencorse
 Lord Justice Clerk – Lord Moncreiff

Events 
 14 February – Alexander Graham Bell files a patent for the telephone in the United States.
 19 February – Partick Thistle F.C. play their first match.
 5 April – River Dee Ferry Boat Disaster: 32 drown.
 18 June – promenade on the roof of Waverley Market opens in Edinburgh; this year also West Princes Street Gardens pass to the city's council as a public park.
 17 October – St Enoch railway station officially opens in Glasgow.
 3 November – McLean Museum opens in Greenock.
 William Forbes Skene's Celtic Scotland: a History of Ancient Alban begins publication in Edinburgh.
 Camp Coffee is first produced by Paterson & Sons Ltd in Glasgow.

Births 
 23 March – Muirhead Bone, etcher (died 1953)
 13 April – Robert Smyth McColl, footballer and retail store founder (died 1959)
 19 June – Nigel Gresley, steam locomotive designer (died 1941)
 6 September – John James Rickard Macleod, physician and physiologist, Nobel Prize laureate (died 1935)
 3 October – Thomas Haining Gillespie, founder of the Royal Zoological Society of Scotland and Edinburgh Zoo (died 1967)
 22 October – Cecilia Loftus, born Marie Cecilia Loftus Brown, actress in music hall and legitimate theatre (died 1943 in the United States)
 4 November – Donald Cameron, 25th Lochiel, soldier and Chief of the Name (died 1951)
 7 November – Alex Smith, international footballer (died 1954)
 17 December – Archibald Main, ecclesiastical historian (died 1947)
 18 December – Henry Wade, surgeon (died 1955)
 Joseph Lee, poet and journalist (died 1949)

Deaths 
 9 January – Thomas Hill Jamieson, librarian (born 1843)
 22 January – Sir George Harvey, genre painter (born 1806)
 3 February – Benjamin Connor, steam locomotive designer (born 1813)
 24 April – Henry Dübs, steam locomotive manufacturer (born 1816 in Germany)
 7 May – David Bryce, architect (born 1803)
 23 June – Robert Napier, engineer, "Father of Clyde Shipbuilding" (born 1791)
 23 December – Charles Neaves, Lord Neaves, judge and poet (born 1800)

See also 
 Timeline of Scottish history
 1876 in the United Kingdom

References 

 
Years of the 19th century in Scotland
Scotland
1870s in Scotland